Cecil Hotel or Hotel Cecil may refer to:

Australia
 Hotel Cecil, North Ipswich, Queensland
 Hotel Cecil (Southport), Queensland

Egypt
 Cecil Hotel (Alexandria)

India
 The Cecil, Shimla

Morocco
 Hotel Cecil (Tangier, Morocco)

United Kingdom
 Hotel Cecil, London, now demolished
 The Unionist government, 1895–1905, nicknamed the "Hotel Cecil" in 1900

United States
 Cecil Hotel (Los Angeles), United States
 Cecil Hotel, New York City, the site of the jazz club Minton's Playhouse

See also
 Cecil (disambiguation)